MLB Showdown (colloq. Showdown) is an out-of-print collectible card game made by Wizards of the Coast that ran from April 2000 to 2005. The game was introduced to the public in 2000, featuring Atlanta Braves third baseman Chipper Jones on the product cover. Since the 2000 base set, cover athletes have included Shawn Green, Gary Sheffield, Manny Ramírez, Luis Gonzalez, Torii Hunter,  Albert Pujols, and Craig Biggio.

Gameplay

MLB Showdown simulates baseball through a card game, with heavy randomness. It involves a 20-sided die and cards made specifically for the game. These cards were available in booster packs, a staple of collectible card games, as well as starter games and draft packs. There are two types of cards: player cards (current and former Major League players) and strategy cards (actions that can add to or subtract from dice rolls, change results, draw extra cards, etc.)

The outcome of an at-bat largely depends on the player cards. The player whose pitcher is pitching that turn rolls a die to determine whether the batting player rolls on the pitcher's chart or the batter's chart. Each of the two charts has a list of possible results from the at-bat.

Organized play
The organized play was set into three levels: local leagues, regionals, and the national championship. The MLB Showdown card game has had four national champions: Scott Forster (2001), Gary Quinn (2002), Keith Pioro (2003), and Terry Dugan (2004).

For the 2005 season, the national championship was set as a different format than it was previously because of changes in organized play. Eight players were regional champions only and won the grand prize of MLB season tickets to the team of his/her choice. However, Wizards of the Coast eventually approved a national championship in Houston, Texas. Prizes were reduced to merely autographed memorabilia sent in from Wizards of the Coast. Four players, Stephen Mendel, Ben Taylor, Jonathan Rosen, and Daniel Rosen split the tournament and were named national champions of the 2005 season.

There was no formal organized play since Showdown was discontinued by Wizards of the Coast in January 2006 until May 20, 2013. On this day play began for the 2013 national championship in Williamsville, NY.

Sets

MLB Showdown timeline
February 4, 2000: MLB Showdown 2000 is announced by Wizards of the Coast.
April 24, 2000: MLB Showdown is put on the market at $2.99 per booster pack.
August 14, 2000: The first expansion set, entitled "Pennant Run," is released.
March 30, 2001: MLB Showdown 2000 is named the 2000 Collectible Card Game of the Year by Card Trade Magazine.
April 2, 2001: MLB Showdown 2001 is released; changes in the game are made to allow more baserunning choices.
July 2001: The strategy card set is released in Pennant Run. New cards include "Mound Conference" and "Pep Talk." "1st Edition" cards are discontinued.
April 29, 2002: MLB Showdown 2002 is released with revamped on-base values.
July 15, 2002: MLB Showdown 2002 Trading Deadline is announced. It was released less than a week later.
September 2002: "Super Season" cards are created, allowing managers to play with player with stats from previous historic seasons in the "Pennant Run" expansion.
March 7, 2003: MLB Showdown 2003 is released. Icons are put onto player cards to supplement gameplay.
June 27, 2003: New rookie season cards let managers play with a card based on a Rookie of the Year winner's rookie season.
August 29, 2003: In the "Pennant Run" set, the Cooperstown Collection subset is created, allowing managers to play with classic Hall of Famers such as Nolan Ryan and Reggie Jackson.
March 26, 2004: MLB Showdown 2004 is released.
March 25, 2005: MLB Showdown 2005 is released.
January 8, 2006: Wizards announces the cancellation of MLB Showdown.

Reviews
Pyramid

Further reading
Strategy in Scrye #52

See also
NFL Showdown
NBA Showdown

Notes and references

External links
MLB Showdown card database

Card games introduced in 2000
Collectible card games
Wizards of the Coast games
Baseball board games